Shakmagia (Jewelry Box in English) is an Egyptian comic book. The title can be translated as "the Jewelry Box", and is considered a burgeoning example of free expression in Egypt.

See also

 List of feminist comic books
 Portrayal of women in comics

References

2014 comics debuts
Comics about women
Egyptian comics